Inman Park–Moreland Historic District is a historic district in Inman Park, Atlanta, Georgia that was listed on the National Register of Historic Places (NRHP) in 1986.  It includes the Kriegshaber House, now the Wrecking Bar Brewpub, which is separately NRHP-listed.

The district spans the Fulton County-DeKalb County border.

The district was increased in 2003.

References

Geography of Atlanta
Historic districts on the National Register of Historic Places in Georgia (U.S. state)
Colonial Revival architecture in Georgia (U.S. state)
Beaux-Arts architecture in Georgia (U.S. state)
Willis F. Denny buildings
Geography of Fulton County, Georgia
Geography of DeKalb County, Georgia
History of Atlanta
Bungalow architecture in Georgia (U.S. state)
National Register of Historic Places in Atlanta